Bang is a compilation album by The Jesus Lizard, containing tracks previously released on EPs and singles, and some unreleased songs.

Track listing
All tracks by The Jesus Lizard, except where noted.
"Chrome" (Chrome) – 3:51
"7 Vs. 8" – 3:33
"Gladiator" – 4:03
"Seasick" – 3:15
"Wheelchair Epidemic" (The Dicks) – 2:11
"Dancing Naked Ladies" – 3:01
"Mouth Breather" – 2:15
"Sunday You Need Love" (Trio) – 2:44
"Glamorous" – 3:03
"Deaf as a Bat" – 1:38
"Lady Shoes" – 2:37
"Killer McHann" – 2:10
"Bloody Mary" – 2:40
"Monkey Trick" – 4:36
"Uncommonly Good" – 2:48
"The Test" – 2:36
"Blockbuster" – 3:32
"Fly on the Wall" – 2:54
"White Hole" – 3:22
"Anna" (Trio) – 2:38

References

2000 compilation albums
The Jesus Lizard albums
Touch and Go Records compilation albums